Staff may refer to:

Pole
 Staff, a weapon used in stick-fighting
 Quarterstaff, a European pole weapon
 Staff of office, a pole that indicates a position
 Staff (railway signalling), a token authorizing a locomotive driver to use a particular stretch of single track
 Level staff, also called levelling rod, a graduated rod for comparing heights
 Fire staff, a staff of wood or metal and Kevlar, used for fire dancing and performance
 Flagstaff, on which a flag is flown
 Scout staff, a tall pole traditionally used by Boy Scouts, which has a number of uses in an emergency
 Pilgrim's staff, a walking stick used by pilgrims during their pilgrimages

Military
 Staff (military), the organ of military command and planning
 , a United States Navy minesweeper
 Smart Target-Activated Fire and Forget (XM943 STAFF), an American-made experimental 120mm tank gun shell

People
 Staff (name), a list of people with either the surname or nickname

Other uses
 People in employment within any organization
 Staff (music), a set of five horizontal lines upon which notes are placed in written music notation
 Staff (building material) (short for staffieren), an artificial stone product used as ornament
 Jack Staff, British superhero
 Staffordshire, a county in England
 Staff, a nickname for the Staffordshire Bull Terrier

See also 
 Celastrus, a shrub genus commonly known as the staff vine or staff tree
 Staphylococcus, often shortened to "staph", bacteria which can cause infection